The 1995–96 Scottish Challenge Cup was the sixth season of the competition, competed for by the 30 member clubs of the Scottish Football League. The previous champions were Airdrieonians, who defeated Dundee 3–2 after extra in the 1994 final.

The final was played on 5 November 1995, between Stenhousemuir and Dundee United at McDiarmid Park in Perth. Stenhousemuir won 5–4 penalties after a 0–0 draw after extra time, to win the tournament for the first time.

Schedule

First round 
Cowdenbeath and Stenhousemuir received random byes into the second round.

Source: SFL

Second round 

Source: SFL

Quarter-finals

Semi-finals

Final

References

External links 
 Scottish Football League Scottish Challenge Cup on Scottish Football League website
 Soccerbase Scottish League Challenge Cup on Soccerbase.com
 ESPN Soccernet  Scottish League Challenge Cup homepage on ESPN Soccernet
 BBC Sport – Scottish Cups Challenge Cup on BBC Sport

Scottish Challenge Cup seasons
Challenge Cup
Scottish Challenge Cup